Eoophyla nandinalis is a moth in the family Crambidae first described by George Hampson in 1906. It is found in the Democratic Republic of the Congo and Kenya.

The wingspan is 18–26 mm. The forewings are whitish and the costa is fuscous in the basal half. There is a fuscous subbasal fascia and a yellow antemedian fascia in the dorsal half of the wing. The hindwings are white with a fuscous subbasal spot and a yellow median fascia.

References

Eoophyla
Moths of Africa